Kasa Khurd is a village in the Palghar district of Maharashtra, India. It is located in the Dahanu taluka.

Demographics 
According to the 2011 census of India, Kasa Khurd had 378 households. The effective literacy rate (i.e. the literacy rate of population excluding children aged 6 and below) was 77.54%.

References 

Villages in Dahanu taluka